Galligan is a surname. Notable people with this surname include:

Claire Galligan, American freestyle swimmer
Danielle Galligan (born 1992), Irish actress and theatre maker
Devin Galligan (died 2003), founder of the charitable organization "Strain the Brain"
John Galligan (1865–1937), American baseball player
Mike Galligan (born 1968), Irish sportsperson
Paul Galligan (1888–1966), Irish politician
Pete Galligan (1860–1917), American politician and baseball player
Rory Galligan (1973–2012), Irish rally car driver
Roseanne Galligan (born 1987), Irish athlete
Shane Galligan, American drag queen and musician, stage name Thorgy Thor
Tom Galligan (college president) (born 1955), American lawyer, legal scholar, administrator and educator
Tom Galligan (mayor) (born 1946), mayor of Jeffersonville, Indiana, US
Walter T. Galligan (1925–2010), American Air Force lieutenant general
Yvonne Galligan, Irish political scientist and consultant
Zach Galligan (born 1964), American actor, Gremlins

See also
Galga
Galgan